Voice – Danmarks største stemme is a Danish reality singing competition, based on the original Dutch television program The Voice of Holland. It started on November 26, 2011, and is currently airing on TV2. One of the important premises of the show is the quality of the singing talent. Four coaches, themselves popular performing artists, train the talents in their group and occasionally perform with them. Talents are selected in blind auditions, where the coaches cannot see, but only hear the auditioner. The show was canceled after two seasons in order to make way for a kids' version, known as Voice Junior.

Format 
The series consists of three phases: a blind audition, a battle phase, and live performance shows. Four judges/coaches, all noteworthy recording artists, choose teams of contestants through a blind audition process. Each judge has the length of the auditioner's performance (about one minute) to decide if he or she wants that singer on his or her team; if two or more judges want the same singer (as happens frequently), the singer has the final choice of coach.

Each team of singers is mentored and developed by its respective coach. In the second stage, called the battle phase, coaches have two of their team members battle against each other directly by singing the same song together, with the coach choosing which team member to advance from each of four individual "battles" into the first live round.  Within that first live round, the surviving four acts from each team again compete head-to-head, with public votes determining one of two acts from each team that will advance to the final eight, while the coach chooses which of the remaining three acts comprises the other performer remaining on the team.

In the final phase, the remaining contestants (Final 20) compete against each other in live broadcasts. The television audience and the coaches have equal say 50/50 in deciding who moves on to the Top 4 phase. With one team member remaining for each coach, the (Top 4) contestants compete against each other in the finale with the outcome decided solely by public vote.

Coaches and finalists 
 – Winning coach/contestant. Winner in bold, eliminated contestants in small font.
 – Runner-up coach/contestant. Final contestant first listed.
 – Third place coach/contestant. Final contestant first listed.
 – Fourth place coach/contestant. Final contestant first listed.

Season summary

Season 1 (2011–12)
The coaches for the debut seasons are four famous singers of the country: Steen Jørgensen, lead singer of Sort Sol, Lene Nystrøm, leadgirl of Aqua, Sharin Foo, one half of the duo The Raveonettes and rapper Liam O'Connor, who is famous as L.O.C. It was hosted by Morten Resen. Sigurd Kongshøj Larsen presented the backstage segments. Among the contestants in this edition are Amie Jones, who was an X-Factor reject twice in a row, and Nanna Kaad - who rose to fame as a professional impersonator of Sharin Foo. Mathias Rønne Pachler and Joakim Tranberg gained huge popularity after confirming that they fell in love with each other during the course of the show and therefore became the first gay-homosexual couple on Danish reality TV.

Season 2 (2012)
Three of the four coaches returned for a second season. They were L.O.C., Sharin Foo (one half of the duo The Raveonettes) and Lene Nystrøm. However, Steen Jørgensen (from the band Sort Sol) was replaced in season 2 by the Danish singer Xander. The series was hosted by Felix Smith. Mattias Hundebøll presented the backstage segments. The series was won by Emelie Paevatalu from Team Liam (L.O.C.) making him the winning coach for the second consecutive season. Andreas Odbjerg of Team Xander was runner up. Christian Krogh Sørensen of Team Lene came third and Dianna Lindharth of Team Sharin fourth.

Kids version 
Voice Junior is a Danish talent show that is broadcast on TV2, based on the Dutch edition "The Voice Kids", which is a spin-off of the original "The Voice" format. Unlike the adult version, participants are only between 8 and 14 years old. Similar to Voice – Danmarks største stemme, the contestant would sing popular hits in front of famous singers who would select them to fill up their teams. The three coaches of Voice Junior are Oh Land, Wafande, and Joey Moe.

In the Blind Audition, the three coaches' chairs rotate to the back of the stage and therefore the coaches cannot see who is singing. After these Blind Auditions, all of the participants must face each other in a "Battle". The coaches group three candidates into a battle and then must select one to send through to the quarterfinals, and then one in the semifinal. Eventually, each coach has a participant in the final. After the viewers have voted, the winner is announced.

From the third season, the programs went live from the quarterfinals, and it was the viewers who chose who passed on via SMS.

In December 2018, it was announced that the show would move to Kanal 5 starting in 2019.

From the sixth season, the rules changed in the quarter-final and semi-final the coaches decide who will go through to the next round and in the final, the fans in the auditorium with their mobile phones decides who will win.

Coaches' timeline

Season summary

See also
The Voice (TV series)

References

External links
Voice – Danmarks største stemme Official website

Denmark
2011 Danish television series debuts
2010s Danish television series
Danish reality television series
Danish-language television shows
TV 2 (Denmark) original programming